Batmen of All Nations are a group of fictional superheroes appearing in American comic books published by DC Comics. The characters were inspired by the superhero Batman to fight crime in their respective countries. The group first appeared in Detective Comics #215. Later the Batmen of All Nations were renamed the International Club of Heroes, often known as just the Club of Heroes. Post-Crisis on Infinite Earths, they were named the Dome (see Global Guardians) and were not inspired by Batman but the Justice Society of America.

Grant Morrison featured them in his 2007 run on Batman (#667-669). Morrison revealed the modern period fates of the "Club of Heroes":

Organization history
In the 1950s, the legend of the Batman had reached the whole world. Many people in other countries were inspired by this to become superheroes themselves. Years later, Batman decided to hold the first meeting with his counterparts in Gotham City.

First, in Batman #56, Batman trained Bat-Hombre at the request of a South American president but he turned out to be a member of an outlaw band. Batman took the identity himself and the original Bat-Hombre was killed fighting him. In Batman #62, he met the Knight and the Squire in England. In Batman #65, he trained Wingman. In Batman #86, he met the Sioux Man-of-Bats and his son Little Raven. In Detective Comics #215, Batman invites the Knight and Squire, the Musketeer, the Gaucho, the Ranger, and the Legionary. In World's Finest Comics #89, philanthropist John Mayhew invites Batman and Robin, Superman, the Legionary, the Musketeer, the Gaucho, and the Knight and the Squire to award them membership in his Club of Heroes. The Knight and Squire then joined the Ultramarine Corps in JLA #26 and had an adventure with them in JLA Classified #1-3.

Recent history

A three-issue story arc in Batman #667-669, written by Grant Morrison and illustrated by J. H. Williams III, shows what has become of the Batmen of All Nations:
 The Knight, a.k.a. Cyril Sheldrake, Earl of Wordenshire, is the adult Squire, having taken up his father's mantle after the original Knight was killed by Spring-heeled Jack, who forced him to swallow a small explosive. As the Squire, Cyril sunk into a depression following his father's death, spending his father's fortune and ending up in the gutter until given help by a young lady named Beryl Hutchinson and her mother. Upon becoming the new Knight, Cyril has appointed Beryl as his Squire. The new Knight is made to suffer a similar fate to his father by John Mayhew, but Man-of-Bats operates on him and removes the explosive before it detonates.
 The Musketeer was sent to an asylum after he accidentally killed a man in battle. After he was released, he wrote a book about the experience, sold off its movie rights, and became rich. Bilal Asselah, a Sunni Muslim and expert parkour exponent who assumes the identity of Nightrunner, was eventually chosen as Batman Inc.'s representative in Paris, France.
 Native American Man-Of-Bats and his son Little Raven, who has grown up and changed his name to Raven Red, have a strained relationship. Man-of-Bats has some medical expertise. Raven Red almost dies at the hands of John Mayhew but is saved by his father, Robin, and the Squire. They later join Batman Incorporated. In that series, they are given names (Dr. Bill Great Eagle and Charlie Great Eagle) and Man-of-Bats is said to have fought in Iraq; the two of them protect and aid an Indian reservation in South Dakota where their identities are publicly known.
 Wingman has changed his look and resembles Batman even more than he originally did. He refuses to admit he worked with Batman and claims he came up with his superhero identity a year before Batman debuted. With his accomplice, billionaire John Mayhew, he kills the Ranger and tries to kill the others. He is later killed by John Mayhew. In Batman Incorporated a new Wingman is shown with his identity a mystery, who is later revealed to be Jason Todd in 2012's Batman Inc. #4.
 El Gaucho has become a serious superhero in Argentina and has changed his look. He is wounded in action but manages to apprehend the traitorous Wingman with one of his trademark boleadoras, saving the life of Batman. He is shown becoming a new member of Batman Incorporated; in the series, he is given a civilian identity as horse-breeder and playboy Santiago Vargas; and a history as a secret agent for the UN spy agency Spyral, where he worked with the first Batwoman and for the villainous Dr. Dedalus.
 The Ranger changes his costume and methods in order to keep up with the increasingly violent villain community. Now calling himself the Dark Ranger, he wields a jetpack and a pulse weapon. He is killed by Wingman, who then steals his identity. Following this, his former sidekick, the Scout, has taken up the mantle as the new Dark Ranger. The new Dark Ranger that used to be Scout is Johnny Riley, an aboriginal tattoo artist in Melbourne's St. Kilda.
 The Legionary has not maintained his physique and loves to reminisce on his past as a superhero. He is stabbed twenty-three times (à la Caesar) by John Mayhew.

In the arc, the group was reunited on John Mayhew's island resort in the Caribbean. The heroes were confronted with a disturbing video showing Dr. Hurt, purportedly wearing the severed skin of Mayhew over his face. On behalf of the Black Glove organization, he challenges the club as representatives of 'good' against his 'evil', destroying their means of transport and threatening to kill them all. The various members of the club are killed or injured in the styles of their various archenemies, causing some to suspect that a 'Club of Villains' has been assembled.

In a traumatic flashback, the Knight reveals the reason that the Club originally disbanded and never succeeded as an international superteam; after losing Batman's commitment, the Club was brought down by scandal when the original Knight discovered that Mayhew had killed his wife and framed Mangrove Pierce, an actor with whom she had been having an affair, for her death. Cast out of the team for his accusations, the Knight lost focus and was murdered by Spring-Heeled Jack; the other heroes went their separate ways, their faith in Mayhew and the team as a whole similarly shattered.

Batman, the Gaucho, and Dark Ranger appear to be the last ones left alive, but Batman realizes that Dark Ranger is in fact Wingman, having swapped suits with the real Ranger and faked his own death. Wingman has been working in concert with the sadistic Mayhew to do the bidding of the Black Glove, having always been jealous of Batman's prowess. Despite injuring the Gaucho, Wingman is defeated by the Argentinean hero and Batman and executed by the Gaucho's archenemy, El Sombrero.

As El Sombrero escapes the island, Batman follows him to unmask him as an impostor, none other than John Mayhew, whose death was also faked by the Black Glove (Dr. Hurt was later to claim that the skin used in the video was that of Mangrove Pierce, who was the star of The Black Glove, a film which Mayhew produced and directed). Mayhew reveals his motivation behind joining the Black Glove and gambling with lives is his boredom at being an aimless socialite; he appears to escape via an ejector seat, leaving his helicopter for Batman to use to rescue the survivors of the Club of Heroes. Mayhew is summarily killed by the Black Glove in the destruction of his island, having foolishly bet that 'evil' would win against 'good'.

Members
 Batman and his sidekick Robin (United States)
 Man-Of-Bats and his sidekick Little Raven (USA–Sioux Indian)
 El Gaucho (Argentina)
 The Knight and his sidekick the Squire (England)
 The Musketeer (later replaced by the Nightrunner) (France)
 The Legionary (Italy)
 The Ranger (later the Dark Ranger) and his sidekick the Scout (Australia)
 Wingman (Sweden)

Club of Villains
In the storyline "Batman R.I.P.", the Batman family fights against the Club of Villains, a counter-group specifically built by the Black Glove Organization to destroy Batman, followed by the remaining Club of Heroes members. The Club was composed of:
 Dr. Simon Hurt: A deranged psychiatrist heading the Black Glove to destroy Batman, body and soul. He claims to be Thomas Wayne and wears the Bat-suit that Bruce's father once wore to a costume party; later, Batman accuses him of being Mangrove Pierce, an actor who was framed for murder by John Mayhew. Hurt denied this, stating that he had skinned Pierce alive and worn "him to Mayhew's party", which probably refers to the events of Batman #667–669. From Batman's final entry in his Black Casebook (in Batman #681), it is implied that Hurt is, in fact, the Devil, as others had previously claimed.
 Le Bossu (Guy Dax): A French villain dressed as a hunchback, with henchmen dressed as gargoyles, whose real identity is brilliant neurosurgeon and 'family man' Guy Dax. He uses the Bossu identity to indulge his violent fantasies. He is shown to admire the Joker until the latter disfigured him with a razor. He sees his disfigurement as an opportunity to give up his old life and become a sadistic monster permanently.
 Pierrot Lunaire: A foe of the Musketeer who dresses as the Commedia dell'arte character Pierrot. Owing to the tradition of mimes, he never speaks.
 King Kraken: A masked deep sea diver whose weapon of choice is a high voltage electric rifle. A foe of Wingman. He believes that "henchmen are for wussies".
 Charlie Caligula: A madman whose schemes are inspired by Julius Caesar and the Roman Empire, Charlie is a foe of the Legionary. He was briefly tortured and left for dead by Batman while the crimefighter was in his "Batman of Zur-En-Arrh" persona.
 El Sombrero: Archenemy of El Gaucho, a lunatic in a luchador mask who designs deathtraps for anyone who is willing to pay. John Mayhew posed as him in order to attempt at escaping culpability for his crimes shortly before the Black Glove executed him. The real Sombrero was believed to be murdered by the Joker, but was later revealed to be alive in Batman, Inc.
 Jezebel Jet: A wealthy woman of African descent who had lost her parents. She is said to own an African province. Pretended to be in love with Batman, though Batman told her to thank Alfred for his acting lessons when the topic was brought up between the two.
 Scorpiana: A sultry assassin who uses a blue scorpion as her calling card. A foe of El Gaucho.
 Swagman: A gunman who speaks in an Australian accent and wears a costume based on the clothes of Australian bandit Ned Kelly. An enemy of Dark Ranger.
 The Joker was briefly recruited by the Club as the maître for Batman's danse macabre.

Other versions

Kingdom Come
A different version of the Batmen of All Nations appears in the critically acclaimed Kingdom Come comic series. The members of this group include "Cossack, the Champion of Russia", "Samurai, the Champion of Japan", and "Dragon, the Champion of China". They were joined by "Batwoman, a Batman admirer from the Fourth World".

International Delegation of Masked Archers
The International Delegation of Masked Archers (also known as The Green Arrows Of The World) were a similar group based on Green Arrow rather than Batman. They appeared in Adventure Comics #250 (July 1958), in a story very similar to the Detective Comics story that introduced the Batmen of All Nations. The members included:

 Ace Archer (Japan)
 Bowman of Britain (United Kingdom)
 Bowman of the Bush (Africa)
 Green Arrow (America)
 Phantom (France)
 Unnamed Green Arrows of Austria, Italy, Mexico, Saudi Arabia, and Spain

International Sea Devils
The International Sea Devils were a similar group based on a team known as the Sea Devils.

 Miguel (South America)
 Molo (Africa)
 Sikki (India)

In other media
The Batmen of All Nations appear in the Batman: The Brave and the Bold episode "Powerless!", with Musketeer voiced by Diedrich Bader, El Gaucho by Jeff Bennett, and Legionnaire by John DiMaggio while Knight, Ranger, Wingman, and a series original Batman from South Africa have no dialogue. In the episode, the Batmen of All Nations battle the "Jokers of All Nations", formed by the Joker and consisting of unnamed Jokerized versions of an Inuit, a Canadian hockey player, a Scotsman, a Cossack, and a Sumo wrestler. Additionally, the Club of Villains make a non-speaking cameo appearance in the episode "The Knights of Tomorrow!", consisting of Pierrot Lunaire, El Sombrero, Swagman, King Kraken, Charlie Caligula, and Scorpiana.

References

External links
 Cosmic Teams: The Club of Heroes
 Batman #667-669: "The Black Glove" (1st appearance of El Sombrero & 1st mention of The Black Glove)
 

Fictional Sioux people